Malinovscoe is a commune in Rîșcani District, Moldova. It is composed of two villages, Lupăria and Malinovscoe.

References

Communes of Rîșcani District